Maria Sharapova was the three-time defending champion, but lost in the second round to Angelique Kerber.

Kerber went on to win the title, defeating Caroline Wozniacki in the final, 3–6, 6–1, 7–5.

Seeds
The top four seeds receive a bye into the second round.

Draw

Finals

Top half

Bottom half

Qualifying

Seeds

Qualifiers

Lucky losers

Draw

First qualifier

Second qualifier

Third qualifier

Fourth qualifier

References 
 Main Draw
 Qualifying Draw

Porsche Tennis Grand Prix Singles
2015 Women's Singles